Thestor basutus, the Basuto skolly or Basuto magpie, is a butterfly of the family Lycaenidae. It is found in South Africa, Botswana and Zimbabwe.

The wingspan is 30–39 mm for males and 35–42 mm for females. Adults are on wing from October to November and from February to April. There is one generation per year.

Larvae of subspecies basutus have been reared on psyllids in nests of the pugnacious ant (Anoplolepis custodiens). Larvae of subspecies capeneri feed on Pulvinaria iceryi until their third instar, the fourth and final instar larvae live in the nests of pugnacious ants, which feed them by trophallaxis, they also feed on detritus and ant larvae.

Subspecies
Thestor basutus basutus (East Cape to Lesotho, the KwaZulu-Natal midlands, the Orange Free State, the North West Province and North Cape, Botswana, eastern Zimbabwe)
Thestor basutus capeneri Dickson, 1972 (Gauteng and, Limpopo Province and Mpumalanga)

References

Butterflies described in 1857
Thestor